Saint-Michel–Montréal-Nord station is a commuter rail station operated by Exo in the borough of Montréal-Nord, in Montreal, Quebec, Canada. It is served by the Mascouche line.

The station is located immediately southwest of Boulevard Pie-IX, parallel to Boulevard Industriel. The station, built on an embankment, possesses a single track with a single low-level side platform on its southeast side. The platform is wheelchair accessible and features a raised wheelchair platform with a ramp to provide access to the trains.

The station has one headhouse, located at the northeastern end of the station on Boulevard Pie-IX. It provides stair and elevator access to platform 1 from the street and the adjacent kiss-and-ride loop. The southwestern end of the station has stair and ramp access to the station's parking lot.

A ceramic mural by Shelley Miller entitled Tissu urbain is located on the exterior wall of the headhouse, with smaller components inside.

As of November 7, 2022, the station offers a transfer to the 56e Rue station of the Pie-IX bus rapid transit line (bus route 439 Express Pie-IX).

Connecting bus routes

References

External links
 Saint-Michel–Montréal-Nord Commuter Train Station Information (RTM)
 Saint-Michel–Montréal-Nord Commuter Train Station Schedule (RTM)
 2016 STM System Map

Exo commuter rail stations
Montréal-Nord
Railway stations in Quebec